is a private junior college located in Japan. The college has six departments, spread out over three separate campuses.

Campuses

Funabashi Campus, Chiba
 Department of Construction
 Department of Engineering Science
 Department of Applied Chemistry

Shonan Campus, Kanagawa
 Department of Bioresource Sciences

Mishima Campus, Shizuoka
 Department of Food and Nutrition
 Department of Commerce and Economics

External links
 Nihon University Junior College Funabashi Campus 
 Nihon University Junior College Shonan Campus 
 Nihon University Junior College Mishima Campus 

Private universities and colleges in Japan
Japanese junior colleges
Universities and colleges in Tokyo